The Six Days of Maastricht was a six-day track cycling race held annually in Maastricht, Netherlands.

It was contested in the MECC Maastricht from 1976 to 1987. In 2006, the event was organized again, but the 2007 edition had to be cancelled due to financial difficulties.

The competition's roll of honor includes victories by Eddy Merckx and Danny Clark. The record of victories, however, belongs to René Pijnen.

Winners

External links 

Cycle races in the Netherlands
Six-day races
Recurring sporting events established in 1976
Recurring sporting events disestablished in 2006
1976 establishments in the Netherlands
2006 disestablishments in the Netherlands
Defunct cycling races in the Netherlands
Sports competitions in Maastricht

References